Ratz is a 2003 animated comedy-adventure television series created by Richard Zielenkiewicz. The show stars two rats, Rapido and Razmo, aboard the S.S. Wanderer, a cheese-filled ship without an actual destination. The focus of the series is on the adventures of the two rats, including guarding the cheese, interacting with other stowaways and various ill-fated encounters with the crew. The rats themselves live in the hull of the ship in a lavish two-bedroom apartment.

The French version features the voices of the comedy duo Éric et Ramzy, while the English version features the voices of Terrence Scammell as Rapido and Rick Jones as Razmo. Unlike most animated programs designed for a younger audience, Ratz has (except for the episode "The Genie") no moral resolve at the end of each episode.

The series debuted on March 7, 2003 on Teletoon in Canada before premiering on France 3 in France on September 21, 2003. It has also been broadcast on various other channels overseas, such as Animania HD & Boomerang in the United States, Cartoon Network in Latin America, Hungama TV, Sony YAY! and Animax in India, MBC3 in the Arab World, K2 in Italy and Toon Disney in the United Kingdom.

The show premiered its episode, "Cheese Connection" on September 21, 2003, and the series finale episode, "Tomo the Sumo" aired on November 11, 2003. It can be streamed online since March 25, 2020 on Netflix, released in French first.

Ratz was originally titled Rapido (in an unaired pilot) and featured a chunkier animation style. Also of interest is the pure blend of traditional animation and 3D animation, making it Canada's most expensive Teletoon show at the time, and the eclectic soundtrack by Hervé Lavandier.

Plot
Ratz mainly focuses on a duo of the eponymous rats, Rapido and Razmo, whose contrasting personalities often have them butt heads with each other. The only thing they both share is their love of cheese, and live on board the S.S. Wanderer for that very reason. As they have occasional encounters with the ship's crewmates, or even get involved, the duo have all sorts of wacky misadventures. Some of the episodes also involve the rats having to deal with new one-shot characters.

Characters
The series' titular duo are composed of two pitch-black rats, Rapido and Razmo, wearing helmets (with goggles attached) and outfits akin to a modern-day pilot (in red and blue, respectively), with elongated ears, lavender eyemask patterns and long snouts. Razmo is erroneously called "Ratz" on the blurb for the show in Sky program guides.
Rapido is a jet set-wannabe with a huge ego to maintain. To get over his large self-doubts and low self-esteem, he acts condescendingly and often boasts having personal connections to various celebrities. Rapido is also a hypocrite, scolding Razmo sharply for engaging in an activity, then secretly pursuing the same later on. Rapido only has interest in himself and will not aide Razmo at all, unless the situation adversely affects himself. His interests include ratboard racing, celebrity magazines, fashion, house music, feeling important and wooing women. He is voiced by Terence Scammell.
Razmo is the shorter and stouter rat. He is a highly productive genius and mechanic, having invented the ratboard and being responsible for all mechanical and electrical issues. He is also forced to perform all chores as Rapido never lends a hand. This has led Razmo to become depressed, emotionally scarred and obsessive-compulsive. Razmo is also childish, sometimes speaking to a plush toy and wetting the bed. His interests include playing stringed bass, jazz, counting the cheese, inventing and making friends. In the original Rapido short, Razmo had a Deep South accent; his voice was changed to have a slight Brooklyn accent. He is voiced by Rick Jones.

The rats themselves also have a means of transport (animated using cel-shaded 3D). An integral part of Ratz is the ratboard, a device resembling a mousetrap with a jet engine strapped to the back. The ratboard provides the rats with speedy travel in and around the ship. Rapido is very fond of his ratboard and enjoys challenging Razmo to races, often winning. Ratboards are also used to reach otherwise inaccessible places, provide speedy rescues, move things by tether or simply to impress guests. In spite of the ratboard's peculiar design choice, the rats humorously enough do not recognize an actual mousetrap, as seen in the episode "The Rat Exterminator". It is also seen in another episode that other rats can also ride on their own ratboards.

The crew of the S.S. Wanderer consists of three personnel: Benny the chef, Svetlana the engineer and The Captain. They aren't intended as the villains of the show, though, Benny is the one most enraged by the rats. The crew will usually return to their normal duties after brushing shoulders with Rapido and/or Razmo. Humorously enough, the crew's diet consists mostly of cheese (their cargo), which Svetlana hates and Benny is allergic to (although said allergies are not seen or discussed within the show).
The Captain is a Scottish seaman and veteran of the seas. He is the only person who knows the final destination of the cheese in the cargo hold. Over the years, he has gone from a rather serious captain to a rather goofy one, often falling into reverie or suggesting absurd courses of action during crises. All of his orders are directed towards the other two crew members. The Captain is voiced by Tony Robinow. 
Svetlana, the Russian engineer. She is responsible for keeping the S.S. Wanderer afloat and is usually found in situations requiring her massive size and strength. Despite her role on the ship, Svetlana attempts to act feminine whenever possible, which isn't very often. She is often talking to or conspiring with Benny. Sveltana is voiced by Sonja Ball. 
Benny, the Japanese chef. Benny is the only one that will give chase to the rats. Despite having five years of culinary arts under his belt, Benny is usually preparing soufflés or sushi for the rest of the crew. He is usually interrupted by Rapido and Razmo when he brings aboard a live animal to be slaughtered. Benny is voiced by Arthur Holden.

Episodes

Reception

The series has no notable reviews and thus holds no Metacritic score.

While being targeted at young children in France, the series has gained a small cult following of older ages in Canada, due to its late-night timeslot. The show is also notable for its positive portrayal of rats, unusual for Western and North American cultures, which often give its fictional rats selfish, antagonizing and evil characteristics. The show is also fondly remembered in France, where it aired on France 3 in 2003, Canal J in 2004, Boing in 2012 and Gulli in 2008.

Merchandise

 Ratz has Region 2 DVD volumes out in France and Belgium, released by Warner Home Video, containing eight episodes per DVD. 
 An album, A fond les bananes !, featuring Éric et Ramzy, has also been released in France. The show's theme song "Pas de panique à bord", the record's opening track, was a minor hit in France.
 In Fall 2004, Smoby Toys released the toy line based on the show such as velvet furred dolls, real working play sets and plushies just like the show of the same name. But as of 2006, Smoby has discontinued the show's toy line.
Ratz had CGI-animated music videos that were released on the Sparx Animation Studios website, along with Teletoon, with eight songs based from the album of the same name.

Broadcast
In 2014, Ratz formerly aired on Kidszone.

References

External links
 Official site (in French)
 Xilam site
 
 Official home site (in French)

Canadian children's animated comedy television series
French children's animated comedy television series
French children's animated adventure television series
Canadian children's animated adventure television series
Xilam
2003 Canadian television series debuts
2003 Canadian television series endings
Teletoon original programming
Animated television series about mice and rats
2000s Canadian animated television series
2003 French television series debuts
2003 French television series endings
2000s French animated television series
English-language television shows